El Maharra (or El Mehara) (Arabic: المـحرة) is a municipality in El Bayadh Province, Algeria. It is part of Chellala District and has a population of 2.138, which gives it 7 seats in the PMA. Its postal code is 32360 and its municipal code is 3219.

Communes of El Bayadh Province
El Bayadh Province